Jon Eugene Minadeo II (born 1983) is an American antisemitic conspiracy theorist, neo-Nazi, white supremacist and former rapper. He is the leader of the antisemitic hate group and conspiracy theory network Goyim Defense League (GDL). He is known for his video platform GoyimTV, banner drops, and his distributions of neo-Nazi propaganda.

Personal life 

Minadeo grew up in northern California in Novato where he lived with his mother in various apartments. He dropped out of Novato High School in the early 2000s and later received a GED. He worked at his grandmother's restaurant, Dinucci’s Italian Dinners, in Valley Ford. His family has a Mexican-American background. Sources claim that there was a rupture in his family and that he has rarely held a steady job since leaving the restaurant. In a March 2022 interview with the Santa Rosa Press Democrat, Minadeo claimed that he does some construction work and that he'd "probably have to leave Petaluma because things are growing so uncomfortable for him."

He had been living in Petaluma until December 2022 when he and his girlfriend Kelly Johnson moved to Florida. Johnson, a yoga instructor, had been fired from two yoga studios in the Bay Area in March 2022 for her connections with Minadeo and for increasingly bigoted comments.

Minadeo has two neo-Nazi tattoos: a Totenkopf on his arm and SS Bolts on his torso.

Acting & Rap Stints 
Minadeo produced two rap albums, "American Man Whore" in 2013 and "Whore Moans" in 2015, under the rapper name Shoobie Da Wop where he rapped about sexual escapades, alcohol and drug use. Prior to that, he appeared in a few independent and short films.

Antisemitism activities

Goyim Defense League 
Minadeo is the leader of the Goyim Defense League white supremacist network and the owner-operator of the antisemitic online video platform GoyimTV. The name uses the term goyim, a Hebrew word for non-Jews. He has produced and distributed antisemitic flyers and instructs followers on how to spread antisemitic messages so that they can't be accused of targeting.

Minadeo uses the social media moniker "Handsome Truth" and wears a chain with a swastika. In 2019, he filed a fictitious business name statement in California to operate business under the name "Handsome Truth Enterprises".

Banners and Flyers 
In August 2020, Minadeo did a banner drop over a Los Angeles highway that read "Honk if you know the Jews want a race war." In 2022, he shared online a photograph of himself holding a sign reading "Greenblatt suck 6 million dicks", referring to Jonathan Greenblatt of the Anti-Defamation League.

In October 2022, he hung a banner above a Los Angeles highway that read "KANYE IS RIGHT ABOUT THE JEWS", referring to Kanye West's antisemitism, prompting criticism from California Governor Gavin Newsom.

On January 28, 2023, Minadeo and three others were cited for littering in Palm Beach, Florida for distributing their flyers to private residences. Law enforcement have said Minadeo's hate speech is protected under the First Amendment to the United States Constitution so there is little they can do to stop his distributing of propaganda.

Jewish congregation 
On Thursday, February 23, 2023, Minadeo, holding a microphone, was captured flashing Hitler salutes and shouting anti-Semitic language at people leaving a Chabad congregation in South Orlando, including yelling "Heil Hitler" and telling people to “go back to Israel” and asking one person "Sir, do you think you should be put in an oven?”

The congregation's Rabbi, Yosef Konikov, said of the group “What they’re accomplishing is actually the opposite of what they think they’re accomplishing." and that “It only strengthens us, strengthens the Jewish resolve, and the Jewish people around the world get more support from the goyim. So if they’re listening: Thanks.”

Arrests 
In September 2022, Minadeo was arrested in Poland under hate speech laws after he and Robert Wilson demonstrated in front of the Auschwitz-Birkenau concentration camp; his swastika necklace and computer were confiscated. While in Poland, Minadeo filmed himself accosting a South Asian tourist on the sidewalk for four minutes, using racial stereotypes, accusing him of invading Europe, and telling him to return to India.

Omegle 
Minadeo regularly runs shock-jock live-streams on Goyimtv where he baits children and teenagers on the live online video chat website Omegle, some from minority backgrounds, and shouts racist insults at them. Minadeo also reads comments of viewers who donate, raising hundreds of dollars during streams.

References

Further reading 
 Goyim Defense League report at the Anti-Defamation League
 March 2022 interview by The Press Democrat

Year of birth missing (living people)
Living people
Antisemitism in California
American conspiracy theorists
People from Sonoma County, California
American neo-Nazis
American Holocaust deniers
People from California